is a retired artistic gymnast from Japan. She was part of the Japanese team that won the bronze medal at the 1966 World Artistic Gymnastics Championships. Nationally, she won three consecutive NHK Cup competitions in 1965–1967.

References

Living people
Japanese female artistic gymnasts
Medalists at the World Artistic Gymnastics Championships
Year of birth missing (living people)
20th-century Japanese women